The following Confederate States Army units and commanders fought in the Battle of Cedar Mountain of the American Civil War. The Union order of battle is shown separately.

Abbreviations used

Military rank
 MG = Major General
 BG = Brigadier General
 Col = Colonel
 Ltc = Lieutenant Colonel
 Maj = Major
 Cpt = Captain
 Lt = Lieutenant
 Sgt = Sergeant

Other
 w = wounded
 mw = mortally wounded
 k = killed

Left Wing, Army of Northern Virginia
MG Thomas J. Jackson

Cavalry

References
Krick, Robert K., Stonewall Jackson At Cedar Mountain, Chapel Hill: The University of North Carolina Press, 1990, .

American Civil War orders of battle